was a Japanese freestyle swimmer. He competed in the 1924 Summer Olympics. In 1924, he did not show for the semi-finals of the 100 metre freestyle event. He was also a member of the Japanese relay team which finished fourth in the 4 × 200 metre freestyle relay competition.

References

External links
Torahiko Miyahata at Sports Reference

1903 births
1988 deaths
Olympic swimmers of Japan
Swimmers at the 1924 Summer Olympics
Sportspeople from Kōchi Prefecture
Japanese male freestyle swimmers
20th-century Japanese people